Man from the Restaurant is a 1927 Soviet drama film directed by Yakov Protazanov based on the story by Ivan Shmelyov. The main role was written for Ivan Moskvin, but he was changed for Chekhov because of illness.

Plot 
After the death of his son at the front, and his wife's demise, widower waiter Skorohodov rents his room to Sokolin, a young man who works as a messenger in one of the offices. The lodger and Skorohodov's daughter fall in love with each other, but an unexpected contender has appeared to the modest young man in the guise of Karasyov, a constant patron of the restaurant, a factory owner who decides to seduce the woman who he has taken a liking to.

Cast
 Michael Chekhov	
 Vera Malinovskaya	
 Ivan Koval-Samborsky	
 Mikhail Narokov	
 Mikhail Klimov
 Andrey Petrovsky
 K. Alekseyeva
 Mikhail Zharov
 Raisa Karelina-Raich
 Sofya Yakovleva
 Stepan Kuznetsov	
 Mark Prudkin

References
.
.

External links

1927 films
Gorky Film Studio films
Soviet black-and-white films
Russian silent feature films
Films directed by Yakov Protazanov
Articles containing video clips
Soviet silent feature films
Soviet drama films
1927 drama films
Russian black-and-white films
Russian drama films
Silent drama films